Aleksandr Kosarev may refer to:
 Aleksandr Kosarev (volleyball)
 Aleksandr Kosarev (politician)
 Aleksandr Kosarev (director)